The canton of Saint-Astier is an administrative division of the Dordogne department, southwestern France. Its borders were modified at the French canton reorganisation which came into effect in March 2015. Its seat is in Saint-Astier.

It consists of the following communes:

Annesse-et-Beaulieu
La Chapelle-Gonaguet
Coursac
Grignols
Jaure
Léguillac-de-l'Auche
Manzac-sur-Vern
Mensignac
Montrem
Saint-Astier
Saint-Léon-sur-l'Isle

References

Cantons of Dordogne